A Burnt Child (Bränt barn) is a novel by the Swedish author Stig Dagerman, published in 1948.

It is Dagerman's most widely read novel both in Sweden, where it has been published in ten editions, and internationally, with translations to twenty languages. The original title derives from the Swedish proverb "Bränt barn skyr elden" ("A burnt child dreads the fire").

An English translation of A Burnt Child was first published in 1950. In 2019, a translation of the novel was published by Penguin European Writers with the title A Moth to a Flame with a preface by Siri Hustvedt.

Plot summary
"Set in a working-class neighborhood in Stockholm, the story revolves around a young man named Bengt who falls into deep, private turmoil with the unexpected death of his mother. As he struggles to cope with her loss, his despair slowly transforms to rage when he discovers his father had a mistress. But as Bengt swears revenge on behalf of his mother's memory, he also finds himself drawn into a fevered and conflicted relationship with this woman - a turn that causes him to question his previous faith in morality, virtue, and fidelity." (from Stig Dagerman US website)

Critical reception
"This is a writer who sees life, and especially family life, under a burning glass; and the result is a novel of extraordinary power. It is an absorbing work." — The Observer, Review 1950

"A literary giant in Sweden, Dagerman conjures a Strindbergian atmosphere of shadowy menace in his brief, intense novel, A Moth to a Flame... The novel absorbs the reader effortlessly... The landscape round Stockholm, with its fog-bound flatlands and grey winter seas, is vividly evoked. This moody, death-haunted novel is well worth reading." — Evening Standard 2019

Adaptations
In 1949 Dagerman adapted the novel to the stage play Ingen går fri ("Nobody Walks Free"), which he directed himself. The novel has been filmed twice, the Swedish Bränt barn in 1967 and The French L'enfant brulé in 1991.

References

20th-century Swedish novels
1948 novels